Stanley Fillmore Hauser (August 7, 1922 - August 11, 1989) was a suffragan bishop of the Episcopal Diocese of West Texas. He was consecrated on August 4, 1979, and retired in 1987.

Early life and education
Hauser was born on August 7, 1922 in Laredo, Texas to Stanley Fillmore Hauser and Elizabeth Mary Merriman. He was educated at the San Antonio High School and then studied at the University of the South from where he earned a Bachelor of Arts in 1943. He then enrolled at the Virginia Theological Seminary and earned a Bachelor of Divinity in 1946. He married Madelyn May Horner on June 5 , 1947 and together had five children. He was awarded an honorary Doctor of Divinity from the Virginia Theological Seminary in 1980.

Ordained Ministry
Hauser was ordained deacon on September 17, 1945 in St Mark's Church, San Antonio, and priest on October 10, 1946 at Calvary Church in Menard, Texas by Bishop Everett Holland Jones of West Texas. He was rector of Calvary Church in Menard, Texas and Minister-in-charge of St James' Church in Fort McKavett, Texas between 1946 and 1947. He then became rector of St John's Church in Sonora, Texas and priest-in-charged of Trinity Church in Junction, Texas from 1947 to 1951. In 1951 he became rector of Zion Church in Charles Town, West Virginia, while in 1960 he became rector of St Mark's Church in Houston, Texas. Between 1968 and 1979, he was the rector of St Mark's Church, San Antonio.

Bishop
On May 8, 1979, Hauser was elected Suffragan Bishop of West Texas on the ninth ballot at a special council meeting. He was consecrated on August 24, 1979 at the San Antonio Convention Center by Presiding Bishop John Allin.   He retained the post until his retirement in 1987.

References

1922 births
1989 deaths
20th-century American Episcopalians
Episcopal bishops of West Texas
20th-century American clergy
Virginia Theological Seminary alumni
Sewanee: The University of the South alumni